J.N.N Arts & Science Women's College is a liberal arts and science women's college located in Kannigaipair, Tamil Nadu near Chennai. The college is approved by Government of Tamil Nadu and is affiliated with the University of Madras.

History
J.N.N Arts & Science Women's College was established in the year 2017 by the Alamelu Ammaal Educational Trust. The Trust also manages J.N.N Institute of Engineering, J.N.N Matriculation & Higher Secondary School, J.N.N Vidyallaya and K.J.N Educational College.

Academics
The colleges offers nine undergraduate courses.

Awards and recognition
J.N.N Arts & Science Women's College has been ranked one among the Top 20 Most Promising Institutes by Higher Education Review, India.

Course Offered
Department of Commerce
 B.Com. (General)
 B.Com. (Accounting & Finance)
 B.Com. (Corporate Secretaryship) 
 B.Com. (Computer Applications)
 
Department of Science
 B.Sc. (Computer Science) 
 B.Sc. (Mathematics)
 B.Sc. (Bio-Chemistry)

Department of Management
 BBA (Business Administration)
 
Department of Humanities
 B.A (English Literature)

References

External links
 Official website

Women's universities and colleges in Chennai
Arts and Science colleges in Chennai
Educational institutions established in 2017
2017 establishments in Tamil Nadu
Colleges affiliated to University of Madras